The 1985 Sun Bowl was a college football postseason bowl game between the Georgia Bulldogs and the Arizona Wildcats.

Background
The Bulldogs finished 5th in the Southeastern Conference in their sixth straight bowl season and first Sun Bowl since 1969. The Wildcats finished tied for 2nd in the Pacific-10 Conference in their first bowl appearance since 1979 and first Sun Bowl since 1968.

Game summary
Steve Crumley gave Georgia a 3–0 lead on his 37 yard field goal, though he re-injured a pulled muscle in his leg, keeping him out the rest of the game. Max Zendejas tied it on a 21 yard field goal to make it 3–3. Less than five minutes into the second half, Zendejas made it 6–3 on field goal from 51 yards out. Martin Rudolph returned an interception 35 yards for a touchdown to make it 13–6. Backup Davis Jacobs made it 13–6 on his 44 yard field goal with 13:20 left. Running back James Debow fumbled the ball at the 23 to give the ball back to the Bulldogs with 12:35 remaining. Georgia would score three minutes later on a Lars Tate touchdown run. With 1:14 remaining, Jacobs missed a field goal from 44 yards to keep it 13–13. The Wildcats drove to the 22, calling timeout to set up a 39 yard attempt by Zendejas. However, his kick went wide, keeping the game a tie. Despite this, he was named MVP. This remains the final tie in Sun Bowl history (since 1996, games cannot end in a tie). Alfred Jenkins went 13-of-22 for 133 yards for Arizona. Tate went 71 yards on 22 carries for Georgia. Zendejas was named MVP on his 2 for 3 success in attempting field goals.

Aftermath
The Wildcats went to the Aloha Bowl the following year, in Smith's last season with the team. Neither team has been to the Sun Bowl since this game.

Statistics

References

Sun Bowl
Sun Bowl
Arizona Wildcats football bowl games
Georgia Bulldogs football bowl games
Sun Bowl
Sun Bowl